Lisa H. Naito is an American politician from the state of Oregon. A Democrat, she has served as a state representative and as a Multnomah County commissioner.

Biography
Naito was elected to the Oregon House of Representatives in 1990, serving three terms. In 1998, she was elected to the county commission and served for ten years. In between those offices she served on the Metro Council.

In March 2004, Naito, along with three other Multnomah county commissioners, approved plans to begin issuing marriage licenses to same-sex couples in Multnomah County; they issued over 3,000 licenses before the move was blocked by a judge the next month.

Naito formed Hooley & Naito, a strategic planning and legislative advocacy firm, with former Congresswoman Darlene Hooley after leaving office.

Personal life
She is married to Steve Naito, the son of Bill Naito.

References

Living people
20th-century American politicians
20th-century American women politicians
21st-century American politicians
21st-century American women politicians
Date of birth missing (living people)
Lawyers from Portland, Oregon
Democratic Party members of the Oregon House of Representatives
Metro councilors (Oregon regional government)
Multnomah County Commissioners
Place of birth missing (living people)
Politicians from Portland, Oregon
Women state legislators in Oregon
Year of birth missing (living people)